Cuicirama is a genus of longhorn beetles of the subfamily Lamiinae, containing the following species:

 Cuicirama cayennensis (Bates, 1881)
 Cuicirama fasciata (Bates, 1866)
 Cuicirama smithii (Bates, 1881)
 Cuicirama spectabilis (Blanchard, 1843)

References

Hemilophini